Sebastian Kornelius Coucheron-Gautier Teigen (born 6 January 1994), known professionally as Coucheron is a Norwegian producer, songwriter and artist. He's worked with artists such as Kehlani, Unge Ferrari, Matoma, Mayer Hawthorne, Josie Dunne and Nick Jonas. He's also been making official remixes for O.T. Genasis, Lemaitre and Emily Warren.

In 2016, You Should Be Here, a Kehlani album that Coucheron worked on was nominated for the Grammy Award for Best Urban Contemporary Album .

Discography

References 

1994 births
Living people
Norwegian producers
Norwegian songwriters